...And Then You Shoot Your Cousin is the eleventh studio album by American hip hop band The Roots. The album was released on May 19, 2014, by Def Jam Recordings.

According to Black Thought, the album is conceptual like the previous one, but unlike Undun, ...And Then You Shoot Your Cousin features several characters in this story, not just one.  Black Thought described the album as a satirical look at violence in hip hop and American society overall.

Release and promotion
In July 2012, Questlove said on his Twitter account that the title of The Roots' next album would have the initials &TYSYC and that it was being recorded, with a different sound to expect than from Undun. In the November 12, 2012 issue of The New Yorker, Questlove revealed that the album is tentatively named & Then You Shoot Your Cousin. In a June 2013 interview with Fuse TV, Questlove said he would prefer to release an album in the first quarter of the year, and that he also had other projects he was working on. In February 2014, in an interview with XXL, Black Thought said that the album would be a concept album in the spirit of Undun. He describes the work as a satire of hip-hop stereotypes featuring several different characters. On April 7, 2014, DJ Kast One premiered their first single from the album, "When the People Cheer", on Hot 97.

Artwork 
The album's artwork is a painting called Pittsburgh Memory by North Carolina-born painter Romare Bearden.

Critical reception

...And Then You Shoot Your Cousin was met with generally positive reviews from music critics. At Metacritic, which assigns a normalized rating out of 100 to reviews from critics, the album received an average score of 70, based on 26 reviews. Andy Kellman of AllMusic felt that it may be the most challenging album from The Roots because of its experimental elements and variety of guest vocalists. Christopher R. Weingarten of Rolling Stone likened it to a hip hop version of Nine Inch Nail's 1994 album The Downward Spiral because of its downbeat, existential theme. Omar Burgess of HipHopDX said that although the music is occasionally discordant, it is also "depressingly good, which makes it a bit of a confusing product in a Hip Hop landscape bifurcated by Golden Era romanticists and the turnt-up set." Robert Christgau wrote in Cuepoint that it is more consistent musically than Undun and is "a touching, upsetting meditation in which a sketchy gangsta wannabe embodies the limits of all striving."

Evan Rytlewski of The A.V. Club said, "With their 11th effort, The Roots have managed yet another album individualistic like little else in hip-hop, but unlike their best work this one's more interested in scholastic provocation than genuine pathos." Jesse Cataldo of Slant Magazine said, "A depiction of disorder and chaos, ... the album's approach [integrates] neatly into an overall sense of claustrophobic dread." Reed Jackson of XXL said, "The Roots have not only proven once again that they are one of hip-hop's most consistent acts, but also one of the genre's most important." Hilary Saunders of Paste said, "The Roots prove their mastery of mixing high and low culture for diverse audiences. It's a headier album, but one rife with significance."

Commercial performance
The album debuted at number 11 on the Billboard 200 chart, with first-week sales of 19,786 copies in the United States. In its second week the album sold 5,856 more copies bringing its total album sales to 25,642.

Track listing

Charts

Weekly charts

Year-end charts

References

External links
 Official website

2014 albums
Concept albums
Def Jam Recordings albums
The Roots albums